The Convention Muslim League (CML) was a faction of the Pakistan Muslim League that split-off in 1962, in support of the military regime of the President of Pakistan, General Ayub Khan. The opposition party was known as the Council Muslim League. Convention Muslim League contested presidential election of Pakistan held in 1965. CML's electoral symbol was a rose.

See also 
 Muslim League Schisms

References

1962 establishments in Pakistan
Muslim League
Muslim League breakaway groups
Defunct political parties in Pakistan
Political parties established in 1962
Political parties with year of disestablishment missing